John Folliot or Folliott may refer to:
 John Folliott (1660–1697), Member of Parliament for Ballyshannon
 John Folliot (British Army officer, died 1748), British Army officer
 John Folliot (British Army officer, died 1762) (1691–1762), British Army officer and Member of Parliament for Longford, Granard and Sligo
 John Folliott (1696–1765), Member of Parliament for Donegal and Kinsale

See also
 John Ffolliott, Irish landowner and Member of Parliament